Earl Allen Richardson (November 22, 1924 – April 9, 2003) was an American baseball shortstop in the Negro leagues.

A native of Montclair, New Jersey, Richardson attended Montclair High School. He played with the Newark Eagles as a teenager in 1943, and served in the US Navy during World War II. Richardson died in Parsippany, New Jersey in 2003 at age 78.

References

External links
 and Seamheads

1924 births
2003 deaths
Baseball players from New Jersey
Baseball shortstops
Newark Eagles players
Sportspeople from Essex County, New Jersey
Montclair High School (New Jersey) alumni
People from Montclair, New Jersey
20th-century African-American sportspeople
21st-century African-American people